Pryazovske is an urban-type settlement in Zaporizhzhia Oblast in Ukraine. Population:

Economy

Transportation
The settlement is on Highway M14 which connects it with Mariupol to the east and with Melitopol, Kherson, Mykolaiv, and Odessa to the west.

The closest railway station is in Melitopol.

References

Urban-type settlements in Melitopol Raion